John Small (7 October 1765 – 21 January 1836) was an English cricketer who played for the Hambledon Club. He is also associated with Hampshire, Marylebone Cricket Club, Kent and Surrey.

Jack Small made his debut in 1784, his career continuing until 1811. He was noted as "a sound batsman" but should not be compared with his father John Small senior, who was still playing when Jack started.

Small played for the Players in the inaugural and second Gentlemen v Players matches in 1806.

He and John Nyren were close friends and Nyren always refers to Small junior as Jack Small. His  younger brother, Eli Small, played for Hampshire.

Notes

Bibliography
 H S Altham, A History of Cricket, Volume 1 (to 1914), George Allen & Unwin, 1962
 Derek Birley, A Social History of English Cricket, Aurum, 1999
 Arthur Haygarth, Scores & Biographies, Volume 1 (1744-1826), Lillywhite, 1862
 Ashley Mote, John Nyren's "The Cricketers of my Time", Robson, 1998
 Ashley Mote, The Glory Days of Cricket, Robson, 1997

1765 births
1836 deaths
English cricketers
Hampshire cricketers
English cricketers of 1701 to 1786
English cricketers of 1787 to 1825
Players cricketers
Hambledon cricketers
Kent cricketers
Marylebone Cricket Club cricketers
Surrey cricketers
Left-Handed v Right-Handed cricketers
Homerton Cricket Club cricketers
Lord Frederick Beauclerk's XI cricketers
R. Leigh's XI cricketers
East Kent cricketers
Lord Yarmouth's XI cricketers
Hampshire and Marylebone Cricket Club cricketers